David M. Schizer (born December 5, 1968) is an American lawyer and academic. He was named the fourteenth Dean of Columbia Law School in 2004. He was appointed Dean at the age of 35, making him the youngest dean in the school's history. He served in this position until June 30, 2014. He went on to serve three years as the CEO of the American Jewish Joint Distribution Committee.

Education and legal career

Schizer is a graduate of Yale University where he earned his B.A., M.A. and J.D. degrees. While there, he was also the editor of the Yale Law Journal. Schizer clerked for U.S. Supreme Court Associate Justice Ruth Bader Ginsburg for the 1994-95 term, and for Judge Alex Kozinski of the U.S. Court of Appeals for the Ninth Circuit from 1993-94 term. Schizer is a member of the Federalist Society.

Schizer worked at Davis Polk & Wardwell prior to joining the Columbia Law faculty in 1998. Schizer has occasionally been mentioned as a potential future United States Supreme Court nominee.

Academic career
After serving as the school's dean, Schizer remained a tenured professor of law at Columbia Law School, where he teaches a colloquium on tax. His research also focuses on energy law and corporate governance issues. Prior to his appointment as dean, Schizer served as the Wilbur H. Friedman Professor of Tax Law at Columbia Law School. For his ingenuity in the classroom, students awarded him the Willis L.M. Reese Prize for Excellence in Teaching in 2002.

Personal life
Schizer practices Orthodox Judaism.

See also 
 List of law clerks of the Supreme Court of the United States (Seat 6)

References

External links
 Biography at Columbia Law School

1968 births
Philanthropists from New York (state)
Columbia University faculty
Deans of Columbia Law School
Federalist Society members
Law clerks of the Supreme Court of the United States
Deans of law schools in the United States
Living people
New York (state) lawyers
New York (state) Republicans
People from Brooklyn
Yale University alumni
Davis Polk & Wardwell lawyers